Malcolm Scott may refer to:
Malcolm Scott (politician) (1911–1989), Australian politician
Malcolm Scott (Australian footballer) (1958–2017), Australian rules football player
Malcolm Scott (English cricketer) (1936–2020), English cricketer and footballer
Malcolm Scott (South African cricketer) (born 1947), South African cricketer
Malcolm Scott (American football) (born 1961), American football player
Malcolm Scott (entertainer) (1872–1929), English comic entertainer and female impersonator
Malcolm Scott, musician in The New Grand
Malcolm Scott, character in 6,000 Enemies

See also
John Scott (sailor) (John Malcolm Scott, born 1934), Australian Olympic silver medal-winning sailor
Malcolm Stoddart-Scott (1901–1973), British Conservative Party politician